Whangaehu is a settlement in the Rangitikei District and Manawatū-Whanganui region of New Zealand's North Island.

Whangaehu is located near the mouth of the Whangaehu River, a large river flowing from for  the crater lake of Mount Ruapehu on the central plateau, southward to the South Taranaki Bight in the Tasman Sea. Water is diverted from the headwaters for the Tongariro Power Scheme.

History

Whangaehu was the site of a Māori settlement when Europeans began settling the nearby Whanganui River mouth at Whanganui in mid-19th century. Nicholas Chevalier depicted the settlement in a sketch in December 1868, which is now in the Museum of New Zealand Te Papa Tongarewa.

Mount Ruapehu has erupted multiple times, causing sludge to flow down the river. In February 1862 James Coutts Crawford was given several old songs and various accounts of the taniwha in the river. Flooding was recorded following the 1889 and 1895 eruptions.

The sudden collapse of part of the Ruapehu crater wall on 24 December 1953 led to New Zealand's worst railway accident, the Tangiwai disaster. A lahar – a sudden surge of mud-laden water – swept down the river.

On 18 March 2007, the mountain crater lake burst, sending an estimated 1.29 billion cubic metres of water, mud, and sludge down the river. The Lahar was 50% bigger than the 1953 Lahar that caused the Tangiwai disaster, but the Ruapehu ERLAWS alarm successfully activated preventing any accidents.

Education

Notable people
 

Vida Mary Katie MacLean (1881–1970), civilian and military nurse, hospital matron

References

Rangitikei District
Populated places in Manawatū-Whanganui